The Yin Mountains, also known by several other names, are a mountain range stretching across about  of northern China. They form the southeastern border of the Gobi Desert and cross the Chinese provinces of Inner Mongolia and Hebei. Among other things, the range is notable for its petroglyphs.

Names
The Yin Mountains are also known by their Chinese name as the Yinshan, which associates them with the great feminine principle of traditional Chinese philosophy. In Mongolian, they are known as the Dalan Qara, Dalan Terigün, Dalan Khar, Moni Agula, or Moni Uul. It was known as Čuγay quzï in Old Turkic texts.

Geography
It begins in the southwest as the Lang Mountains at the northern loop of the Yellow River. Its eastern end is reckoned as about the area of Chengde.

History
Chinese historians record that the range was a stronghold of the Xiongnu ruler Modu Chanyu around 200BCE. The Yan, Qin, and Han border walls follow its southern ridges.

The Tang poet Bai Juyi (772846) composed the "Yinshan Roads" about its paths.

References

 . 
 . 

Mountain ranges of China
Mountain ranges of Inner Mongolia
Mountains of Hebei
Gobi Desert